Mount Inverleith is a mountain,  high, overlooking Andvord Bay, located roughly five miles due south of the bay's southern shoreline (Lester Cove). Mount Inverleith is flanked by Dallmeyer Peak to the north and by the Grubb Glacier and Bagshawe Glaciers to the west.

It is located roughly 9.5 miles southwest of Brown Station, on Danco Coast in western Graham Land, Antarctica.

The mountain was first charted and named "Iverleith Hill" by Scottish geologist David Ferguson in 1913–14.

References

External links 
 Current weather conditions  
 Photograph of northern slope facing Paradise Bay

Mountains of Graham Land
Danco Coast